The Niobe ground squirrel (Lariscus niobe) is a species of rodent in the family Sciuridae. It is endemic to the mountains of western Sumatra, and eastern Java, in Indonesia. Its natural habitat is subtropical or tropical dry forests.

References

Thorington, R. W. Jr. and R. S. Hoffman. 2005. Family Sciuridae. Pp. 754–818 in Mammal Species of the World a Taxonomic and Geographic Reference. D. E. Wilson and D. M. Reeder eds. Johns Hopkins University Press, Baltimore.

Lariscus
Endemic fauna of Indonesia
Rodents of Indonesia
Fauna of Java
Fauna of Sumatra
Taxonomy articles created by Polbot
Mammals described in 1898
Taxa named by Oldfield Thomas